Lenti is a district in Zala County. Lenti is also the name of the town where the district seat is found. The district is located in the Western Transdanubia Statistical Region.

Geography 
Lenti District borders with Körmend District (Vas County) to the north, Zalaegerszeg District to the east, Letenye District to the south, Slovenia to the west. The number of the inhabited places in Lenti District is 48.

Municipalities 
The district has 1 town and 47 villages.
(ordered by population, as of 1 January 2013)

The bolded municipality is city.

See also
List of cities and towns in Hungary

References

External links

Postal codes of the Lenti District

Districts in Zala County